In Greek mythology, Cyllene (Ancient Greek: Κυλλήνη Kyllênê) may refer to two characters:

 Cyllene, an Arcadian oread (mountain-nymph) who gave her name to the Mt. Cyllene. She nursed the infant god Hermes, who was born on Mt. Cyllene. She became the wife of Pelasgus by whom she bore the impious king, Lycaon. Otherwise, the latter's mother was either the Oceanid Meliboea or Deianira, daughter of another Lycaon. In some accounts, Cyllene was instead the wife of Lycaon but in others versions of the myth, his wife was called Nonacris.

 Cyllene, an Arcadian daughter of Menephron who was raped by her father. In some accounts, Menephon was the son who ravished his mother Cyllene.

Notes

References 

 Apollodorus, The Library with an English Translation by Sir James George Frazer, F.B.A., F.R.S. in 2 Volumes, Cambridge, MA, Harvard University Press; London, William Heinemann Ltd. 1921. ISBN 0-674-99135-4. Online version at the Perseus Digital Library. Greek text available from the same website.
 Dionysus of Halicarnassus, Roman Antiquities. English translation by Earnest Cary in the Loeb Classical Library, 7 volumes. Harvard University Press, 1937-1950. Online version at Bill Thayer's Web Site
 Dionysius of Halicarnassus, Antiquitatum Romanarum quae supersunt, Vol I-IV. . Karl Jacoby. In Aedibus B.G. Teubneri. Leipzig. 1885. Greek text available at the Perseus Digital Library.
 Fowler, Robert L., Early Greek Mythography. Volume 2: Commentary. Oxford University Press. Great Clarendon Street, Oxford, OX2 6DP, United Kingdom. 2013. 
Gaius Julius Hyginus, Fabulae from The Myths of Hyginus translated and edited by Mary Grant. University of Kansas Publications in Humanistic Studies. Online version at the Topos Text Project.
 Pausanias, Description of Greece with an English Translation by W.H.S. Jones, Litt.D., and H.A. Ormerod, M.A., in 4 Volumes. Cambridge, MA, Harvard University Press; London, William Heinemann Ltd. 1918. . Online version at the Perseus Digital Library
 Pausanias, Graeciae Descriptio. 3 vols. Leipzig, Teubner. 1903.  Greek text available at the Perseus Digital Library.

Oreads
Nymphs
Arcadian mythology
Incest in Greek mythology